Sukhteh Gaz (also Romanized as Sūkhteh Gaz; also known as Tang-e Posht) is a village in Ashar Rural District, Ashar District, Mehrestan County, Sistan and Baluchestan Province, Iran. At the 2006 census, its population was 215, in 47 families.

References 

Populated places in Mehrestan County